Zurab Sturua (born 8 June 1959) is a Georgian chess player, who was awarded the title of grandmaster by FIDE in 1991.
He won the Georgian Chess Championship in 1975, 1977, 1981, 1984 and 1985 and played for Georgia in the Chess Olympiads of 1992, 1994, 1996, 1998, 2000 and 2002.

Sturua won the Master Open of the Biel Chess Festival in 1991 and 1996. He tied for 1st–5th places with Jaan Ehlvest, Christopher Lutz, Gyula Sax and Aleksander Delchev at Pula 1997. In 1998, he tied for 7th–11th with Giorgi Bagaturov, Ioannis Nikolaidis, and Ashot Nadanian in the zonal tournament in Panormo, Crete, which was the qualifying tournament for the FIDE World Chess Championship 1999. 

In 2005 , Sturua tied for 1st–2nd with Mikheil Kekelidze at the Zayed Open in Dubai, winning the tournament on tiebreak.

Sturua won the over-50 section of the World Seniors' Championship in 2014 and won the same division at the European Seniors' Championship in 2015, 2016, and 2019.

References

External links
Zurab Sturua chess games at 365Chess.com

1959 births
Living people
Chess grandmasters
Chess Olympiad competitors
Chess players from Georgia (country)
Place of birth missing (living people)
World Senior Chess Champions